James A. "Bucky" Freeman (July 19, 1895 – December 25, 1987) was an American football and baseball coach.

Coaching career

Football
Freeman was the second head football coach at Ithaca College in Ithaca, New York.  He held that position for 13 seasons, from 1931 until 1946, with exception of the years 1944–1945, when the school did not field a team due to World War II.  His coaching record at Ithaca was 36–32–6.

Baseball
Freeman was also the baseball coach at Ithaca, from 1931 through the 1965 season. He was only the second coach to hold the position, and included an appearance in the 1962 College World Series. As coach he led his teams to four NCAA tournament appearances at a time when all NCAA teams played in the same division.
  
Freeman later coached at Cornell and was inducted into the American Baseball Coaches Association Hall of Fame.

References

1895 births
1987 deaths
Ithaca Bombers baseball coaches
Ithaca Bombers football coaches
People from Bergen, New York